Finniss River is the name of two rivers in Australia, both named after colonial surveyor Boyle Travers Finniss.
 Finniss River (Northern Territory) flows west into Fog Bay southwest of Darwin
 Finniss River (South Australia) flows east from the Mount Lofty Ranges into Lake Alexandrina

See also
Fog Bay and Finniss River Floodplains